União Recreativo Social Olímpico, commonly known as URSO, is a Brazilian football team based in Mundo Novo, Mato Grosso do Sul state. The club was formerly known as Clube Atlético Mundo Novo,

History
The club was founded on February 10, 2000, as União Recreativo Social Olímpico. The club was in 2010 renamed back to União Recreativo Social Olímpico, being known by the acronym URSO.

Stadium
União Recreativo Social Olímpico play their home games at Estádio Municipal Cacildo Cândido Pereira, also known as Toca do Urso. The stadium has a maximum capacity of 2,000 people.

References

Association football clubs established in 2000
Football clubs in Mato Grosso do Sul
2000 establishments in Brazil